Paraleprodera triangularis is a species of beetle in the family Cerambycidae. It was described by James Thomson in 1865, originally under the genus Epicedia. It is known from India, Vietnam, Laos, Thailand, and Myanmar.

References

Lamiini
Beetles described in 1865